The Heaphy River is a river of the northwestern South Island of New Zealand. It flows through Kahurangi National Park, rising on the northern slopes of Amohia Peak and initially flowing northwest before turning southwest to reach the Tasman Sea 30 kilometres north of Karamea. Stages of the Heaphy Track follow the lower course of this river, with the track reaching the coast at the river's mouth. The Heaphy River is located in the Buller District.

The river is named for Charles Heaphy, a soldier who explored the area in the 1840s.

Tributaries to the Heaphy River that are named "river" are (source to sea) the Lewis River and the Gunner River.

See also
List of rivers of New Zealand

Notes

References

Kahurangi National Park
Rivers of the West Coast, New Zealand
Rivers of New Zealand
Buller District